Gouldie is a surname. Notable people with the surname include:

Alexandra Gouldie (born 1991), American volleyball player
Archie Gouldie (1936–2016), Canadian professional wrestler
Robert Gouldie (1905–1968), South African cricketer

See also
Goldie (surname)